This is a list of the 24 characters (deipnosophists or sophists at dinner) who take part in the banquet described by Athenaeus of Naucratis in the Deipnosophistae. Some of them can be probably identified with great names of the past, but it is still debated if most of the Deipnosophists were fictions. A digital version of the index of the characters of the Deipnosophists published by Georg Kaibel is available through the Digital Athenaeus project (Dialogi Personae).

Characters

Athenaeus of Naucratis 
Athenaeus is the narrator of the Deipnosophistae and also a guest at the dinner party described in the work. He is presented as the father of the book and as offering his account to Timocrates, imitating Plato in his dramatization of the dialogue. In the text we are informed that Athenaeus wrote also a work On the Kings of Syria (5.211a = 5.47 = FGrHist 166 F 1 = BNJ 166 F 1) and a private treatise on small sea-fishes (thraittai) (7.329c = 7.138).

Timocrates 
Timocrates is Athenaeus’ interlocutor (1.1a = 1.1).

Aemilianus of Mauretania 
Aemilianus of Mauretania is a grammarian (e.g., 3.126b = 3.100).

Alceides of Alexandria 
Alceides of Alexandria is a musician (1.1f = 1.2; 4.174b = 4.75).

Amoebeus 
Amoebus is a citharode (14.622d–e = 14.17).

Arrian 
Arrian is a grammarian (3.113a = 3.79).

Cynulcus 
Cynulcus ( is a Cynic philosopher whose given name is Theodorus (e.g. 1.1d = 1.2; 3.97c = 3.51).

Daphnus of Ephesus 
Daphnus of Ephesus is a physician (e.g. 1.1e = 1.2; 2.51a = 2.35).

Democritus of Nicomedia 
Democritus of Nicomedia is a philosopher (1.1e = 1.2; 3.83c = 3.25).

Dionysocles 
Dionysocles ( is a physician (3.96d = 3.50, 116d = 3.84).

Galen of Pergamum 
Galen of Pergamum ( is the famous physician (e.g. 1.1e = 1.2, 26c = 1.48).

Larensius 
Larensius of Rome is identified with Publius Livius Larensis, a Roman official and also host of the party of the Deipnosophistae (e.g. 1.1a = 1.1; 2.50f = 2.35).

Leonides of Elis 
Leonides of Elis is a grammarian (e.g.:1.1d = 1.2; 3.96d = 3.50).

Magnus 
Magnus is defined as philotrápezos (fond of the table), but is not associated with any professions or arts (e.g. 3.74c = 3.6).

Masurius 
Masurius is a jurist, poet and musician, and can be probably identified with Masurius Sabinus (e.g. 1.1c = 1.2; 14.623e = 14.18).

Myrtilus of Thessaly 
Myrtilus of Thessaly is a grammarian (e.g. 3.83a = 3.25).

Palamedes the Eleatic 
Palamedes the Eleatic is a lexicographer (9.379a = 9.55).

Philadelphus of Ptolemais 
Philadelphus of Ptolemais is a philosopher (1.1d = 1.2).

Plutarch of Alexandria  
Plutarch of Alexandria is a grammarian (e.g. 1.1c = 1.2; 3.83b = 3.25).

Pontianus of Nicomedia 
Pontianus of Nicomedia is a philosopher (1.1d = 1.2; 3.109b = 3.74).

Rufinus of Nicaea 
Rufinus of Nicaea is a physician (1.1f = 1.2).

Ulpian of Tyre 
Ulpian of Tyre is a grammarian and also symposiarch and possibly father of the famous jurist Ulpian (e.g. 1.1d = 1.2; 2.49a = 2.32).

Varus 
Varus ( is a grammarian (3.118d = 3.88).

Zoilus 
Zoilus is a grammarian (e.g. 1.1d = 1.2; 7.277c = 7.5).

References

Bibliography
 
 
 
 

Lists of minor fictional characters